Meshwork may refer to:

Mesh work
Mesh networking
Trabecular meshwork, an area of tissue in the eye
Meshwork (album), 1995 album by German band X Marks the Pedwalk